Harold G. Barrett is an American Emeritus Professor of Speech Communication at California State University.  He is also a writer rhetorician on the subject of ethics and civility in communication.

Early life an education
Barrett earned an A.B., 1949, and an M.A., 1952, from the University of the Pacific. He graduated with a Ph.D. in 1962 from the University of Oregon.

Career
During his career Barrett published a number of books. One of his better known works, Rhetoric and Civility Human Development, Narcissism, and the Good Audience, was published in 1991. In this book Barrett discusses classical rhetorical theory and interprets it for use in all interactions, exploring origins in infancy of the rhetorical disposition and the rhetorical indisposition. Barrett provides four case-study chapters of the lives of individuals illustrating unhealthy narcissism and rhetorical failure, and illustrates how unfavorable narcissism can give adverse direction to the rhetorical imperative and lead to problems in relationships. Barrett offers a rhetorical corrective.

Barrett also published a number of journal articles on various subjects related to rhetoric and effectiveness in verbal communication, both currently and in historical context.

For many years Barrett was the coordinator of California State University's Conference in Rhetorical Criticism.

Selected publications
Maintaining the Self in Communication
Rhetoric of the People: Is There Any Better Or Equal Hope in the World? (editor)

References

Year of birth missing (living people)
Living people
Rhetoric theorists
California State University faculty
University of the Pacific (United States) alumni
University of Oregon alumni